WOI-FM (90.1 FM) is a radio station licensed to Ames, Iowa, serving the greater Ames/Des Moines area. The station is owned by Iowa State University. WOI-FM is an affiliate of Iowa Public Radio, and carries IPR's "News and Studio One" service—a mix of National Public Radio news programming and adult alternative music.

WOI-FM first hit the airwaves on December 1, 1949.  It was originally a full-time simulcast of WOI-AM.  The two stations went their separate ways in the 1960s.

Until the formation of Iowa Public Radio in 2004, WOI-FM was the flagship station for a mini-network of FM stations in central Iowa, including KWOI in Carroll and KTPR in Fort Dodge.

For most of the time since the formation of NPR, WOI-FM aired a mix of classical music and NPR news and talk programming, simulcasting many programs with its AM sister. Shortly after midnight on September 10, 2012, IPR switched WOI-FM's format to the News and Studio One service.  The classical service moved to WOI-FM's second digital subcarrier.  For those without HD Radio, classical music continues to be heard in portions of central Iowa on five full-power stations that between them cover most of the region.

HD Programming
WOI-FM broadcasts two digital channels in the HD Radio (hybrid) format.

See also Iowa Public Radio

External links
Iowa Public Radio

References

µ
NPR member stations
Classical music radio stations in the United States
Radio stations established in 1949
1949 establishments in Iowa
Iowa State University